Phalanta phalantha, the common leopard or spotted rustic, is a sun-loving butterfly of the nymphalid or brush-footed butterfly family.

Description

The common leopard is a medium-sized butterfly with a wingspan of 50–55 mm with a tawny colour and marked with black spots. The underside of the butterfly is more glossy than the upper and both the male and female are similar looking. A more prominent purple gloss on the underside is found in the dry-season form of this butterfly.

Distribution and subspecies
The butterfly is found in Subsaharan Africa and southern Asia (including India, Bangladesh, Sri Lanka, and Myanmar) in a number of subspecies.

P. p. phalantha
P. p. luzonica Fruhstofer (Philippines)
P. p. columbina (Cramer) (southern China, Hainan and possibly Taiwan)
P. p. araca (Waterhouse & Lyell, 1914) (Australia)
P. p. aethiopica (Rothschild & Jordan, 1903) (Madagascar, Seychelles, Aldabra, Comoro, Tropical Africa)
P. p. granti (Rothschild & Jordan, 1903) (Socotra Island)

Status
It is widely distributed and abundant; from the tops of hills in Sri Lanka and southern India and up to 3000 m in the Himalayas, as well as the whole of Subsaharan Africa.

Habits

Sun loving and avoids shade. Seen in the plains, gardens, and edges of clearings. Has active and sharp flight movements. Visits flowers regularly especially Lantana, Duranta, Meyenia laxiflora, Gymnosporia montana, and thistles. Often seen mudpuddling from damp patches in the ground, either alone or in groups. A regular basker with wings spread wide open. It is commonest in dry areas and dry weather and absent from the wetter parts of India during the monsoon. It often perches on edges of clearing with wings half open and has the habit of chasing away other butterflies and guarding its territory.

Larval host plants
Food plants are species of family Bixaceae. It has been recorded breeding on Flacourtia indica, Flacourtia montana, Smilax, Xylosma longifolium, and Salix.

Larval host plants recorded from families Acanthaceae, Compositae, Flacourtiaceae, Primulaceae, Salicaceae, Rubiaceae, Violaceae and specific plants are Barleria prionitis, Canthium parviflorum, Coffea arabica, Dovyalis caffra, Dovyalis gardnerii, Dovyalis hebecarpa, Dovyalis macrocalyx, Dovyalis rotundifolia, Flacourtia indica, Flacourtia inermis, Flacourtia jangomas, Flacourtia montana, Flacourtia ramontchii, Mangifera indica, Maytenus buchanii, Melaleuca leucadendra, Petalostigma quadriloculare, Populus alba, Populus × canescens, Populus deltoides, Salix babylonica, Salix tetrasperma, Salix warburgii, Scolopia chinensis, Scolopia oldhami, Scolopia scolopia, Smilax tetragona, Tridax procumbens, Trimeria grandifolia, Xylosma racemosa.

Life cycle gallery

See also

Nymphalidae
List of butterflies of India
List of butterflies of India (Nymphalidae)

References

Vagrantini
Insects of Pakistan
Butterflies described in 1773
Butterflies of Singapore
Butterflies of Indochina
Butterflies of Africa
Butterflies of Asia
Taxa named by Dru Drury